Ingrid Losert (born 30 December 1958) is a retired German fencer. She won four medals in the team foil at world championships.

Losert followed her father Joseph and brother Roland, both Olympic fencers, and started training in the age of seven. In 1975 she won a bronze medal at the World Junior Championships in Mexico. In 1978 she enrolled to the University of Freiburg to study English, French and Spanish.

In the early 1990s she spent time teaching French and German at St. Edward's Church of England School in Romford, England.

References

1958 births
Living people
German female fencers
Sportspeople from Freiburg im Breisgau